Mock-Lo-Motion is a live album by pianist and composer George Gruntz's Trio with special guest trumpeter Franco Ambrosetti  which was recorded in Germany in 1995 and released on the TCB label.

Reception

The Allmusic review by Scott Yanow stated "Gruntz has an original piano style within the modern mainstream of jazz, with his own fresh chord voicings ... A fine effort".

Track listing
All compositions by George Gruntz except where noted
 "Mock-Lo-Motion" – 10:34
 "You Should Know By Now" – 9:55
 "One for Kids" – 8:36
 "Annalisa" (Franco Ambrosetti) – 11:58
 "Giuseppi's Blues" (Mike Richmond) – 5:16
 "Vodka-Pentatonic" (Ambrosetti) – 11:20

Personnel
George Gruntz – piano
Franco Ambrosetti – flugelhorn (tracks 2, 4 & 6)
Mike Richmond – bass
Adam Nussbaum – drums

References

George Gruntz live albums
1995 live albums